Jennings Township, Ohio, may refer to:

 Jennings Township, Putnam County, Ohio
 Jennings Township, Van Wert County, Ohio

Ohio township disambiguation pages